Abdullah Quaye (born 24 September 1980), formerly Awulley Junior Quaye, is a Ghanaian former professional footballer who played as a midfielder.

Club career
Quaye was born in Accra. He had a spell with Málaga CF in Spain's La Liga.

International career
Quaye was a member of the Ghana national team and participated in the 1997 FIFA U-17 World Championship in Egypt.

Personal life
Quaye converted to Islam shortly after his joining of Meccan side Al-Wahda and changed his name to Abdullah. He is the brother of Lawrence Quaye, a Ghana-born naturalised Qatari footballer.

References

External links
 
 

1980 births
Living people
Converts to Islam
Ghanaian footballers
Association football midfielders
CD Ourense footballers
Málaga CF players
Accra Hearts of Oak S.C. players
Ettifaq FC players
CS Sfaxien players
Zamalek SC players
Al-Wehda Club (Mecca) players
Al Ittihad Alexandria Club players
La Liga players
Ghana Premier League players
Saudi Professional League players
Tunisian Ligue Professionnelle 1 players
Egyptian Premier League players
Ghanaian expatriate footballers
Expatriate footballers in Spain
Expatriate footballers in Saudi Arabia
Expatriate footballers in Tunisia
Expatriate footballers in Egypt
Ghanaian expatriate sportspeople in Spain
Ghanaian expatriate sportspeople in Saudi Arabia
Ghanaian expatriate sportspeople in Tunisia
Ghanaian expatriate sportspeople in Egypt